Canadian singer Celine Dion has released 137 singles in both English and French discography as a lead artist (including promotional singles). According to Billboard, Dion is the world's best-selling contemporary female artist of all time. As of 2021, she has reportedly sold over 250 million records worldwide. Widely recognized as the "Priestess of Pop", Dion has released a string of worldwide hits, with "My Heart Will Go On" (love theme from the blockbuster film Titanic) being her career's biggest hit, with estimated physical sales of over 18 million worldwide, making it the 2nd best-selling physical single by a woman in history. It reached over 117 million radio impressions during its peak, becoming the most-played radio hit in history (at that time) and became the best-selling single of 1998 worldwide. "Because You Loved Me" is her biggest hit on Billboard Hot 100, spending six weeks atop the charts and sold six million copies in its first six months of availability worldwide. "Pour que tu m'aimes encore" (considered as her French signature hit) was the 4th biggest hit of the 1990s in France and has sold over four million copies worldwide.

As of 2018, Billboard ranks Dion as the 25th Greatest Hot 100 Female Artist of all time. She also ranks as the 43rd Greatest Adult Pop Songs Artist of all time and the 40th Greatest Pop Songs Artist of all time. "Because You Loved Me" is the 45th Greatest Hot 100 Song by women of all time in the United States. Dion also placed seven hits on Billboard'''s list of Top Songs of the 90s including: "Because You Loved Me" (No. 27), "It's All Coming Back to Me Now" (No. 66) and "The Power of Love" (No. 67). Dion is also recognized as the "Queen of Adult Contemporary". She has scored 11 number one hits on Adult Contemporary chart, the most for any female recording artists in history. Additionally, she has spent a staggering 87 weeks at the top position of the chart, the most for any artists ever.

At age twelve, Dion collaborated with her mother and brother, Jacques to compose her first song, "Ce n'était qu'un rêve", which was released as a single in Quebec, Canada in 1981. During the 1980s, Dion topped the Quebec chart with six of her singles, including "D'amour ou d'amitié", "Mon ami m'a quittée", and four songs from the Incognito album. In 1985, "Une colombe" won two Félix Awards for Song of the Year and Best Selling Single of the Year. Both "D'amour ou d'amitié" and "Une colombe" were certified gold in Canada. Elsewhere, "Tellement j'ai d'amour pour toi" won the Best Song Award at the World Popular Song Festival in Japan in 1982, and in 1983, Dion became the first Canadian artist to receive a gold record in France for the single "D'amour ou d'amitié". Further success in Europe came when she represented Switzerland in the Eurovision Song Contest 1988 with the song "Ne partez pas sans moi", which later won the contest.

In 1990, Dion made her debut into the American market with Unison. The album included "Where Does My Heart Beat Now", which became her first single to reach the top ten on the US Billboard Hot 100, peaking at number four. In 1991, Dion sang with Peabo Bryson in the song "Beauty and the Beast". It became her second top ten Billboard Hot 100 single, first top ten entry in the United Kingdom, and won the Academy Award for Best Original Song, as well the Grammy Award for Best Pop Performance by a Duo or Group with Vocals. Her following single from Celine Dion, "If You Asked Me To" peaked at number four on the Billboard Hot 100 and topped the chart in Canada. Released in late 1993, The Colour of My Love spawned Dion's first US and Australian, and second Canadian number-one single, "The Power of Love". In the United States, the song was certified platinum and has sold 1.5 million copies. Another single from The Colour of My Love, "Think Twice" topped the UK Singles Chart for seven weeks and has sold over 1.3 million copies there. It became only the fourth million-selling single ever in the UK by a female artist. "Think Twice" also topped the charts in other European countries, including Belgium, Denmark, Ireland, Netherlands, Norway and Sweden.

Keeping to her French roots, Dion continued to release French language recordings between each English album. After Dion chante Plamondon in 1991, D'eux was released in 1995 and amassed huge success with the single, "Pour que tu m'aimes encore". The song reached number one in France and stayed at the top position for twelve weeks. "Pour que tu m'aimes encore" topped the charts in Francophone countries and also peaked inside top ten in the UK, Ireland, Netherlands and Sweden. The next single, "Je sais pas" also reached number one in France and Belgium. In 1995, Dion released "To Love You More" in Japan, where it reached number one, selling 1.5 million copies. As a result, she became the first non-Japanese artist in twelve years to garner a number-one hit on the Oricon Singles Chart.

Released in 1996, Falling into You featured the US, Canadian and Australian chart topping single "Because You Loved Me", which has sold over two million copies in the US alone and is Dion's biggest Billboard Hot 100 hit. Other successful singles from the album included "It's All Coming Back to Me Now" and "All by Myself", which both reached the top five on the Billboard Hot 100. "It's All Coming Back to Me Now" became Dion's third platinum single in the US, with sales of 1.6 million copies. In 1997, she released the most-successful single of her career, "My Heart Will Go On". Serving as the love theme to the 1997 blockbuster motion picture, Titanic (also included on Let's Talk About Love), the single topped the charts across the world, and became Dion's signature song. "My Heart Will Go On" won the Academy Award for Best Original Song, and it gave Dion two additional Grammy Awards for Best Female Pop Vocal Performance, and the most coveted Record of the Year. "My Heart Will Go On" was certified diamond, multi-platinum and gold around the world. It remains Dion's highest seller and one of the best-selling singles of all time, with global sales of over eighteen million, including two million in Germany, 1.8 million in the US, 1.5 million in the UK, and 1.2 million units in France. With "Think Twice" and "My Heart Will Go On", Dion became the first female artist with two million-selling singles in the UK. She is also one of the biggest selling female singles artists of all time in the UK.

In 1998, Dion released another French-language album, S'il suffisait d'aimer, and her first English-language holiday album, These Are Special Times. The latter featured "I'm Your Angel", a duet with R. Kelly, which became Dion's fourth Billboard Hot 100 number-one and her fourth million-selling platinum single in the US. Released in 1999, All the Way... A Decade of Song included the successful lead single "That's the Way It Is", which reached number six on the Billboard Hot 100. After a two-year hiatus, Dion appeared on Garou's single, "Sous le vent". This duet reached number one in Francophone countries, and was certified diamond in France. In 2002, Dion released the album, A New Day Has Come. The first single was the title track, which peaked at number twenty-two on the Billboard Hot 100, and spent twenty-one consecutive weeks at number one on the Billboard Hot Adult Contemporary Tracks, breaking the record for the longest span at the top. The previous record holder was Dion's own "Because You Loved Me", which lasted nineteen weeks at number one. Dion has logged 87 weeks atop the Hot Adult Contemporary Tracks chart, the most of any artist. She has also tallied the most AC number ones – eleven – by a female artist. In 2007, the single "Taking Chances" gave Dion ownership of the most top ten hits on the Hot Adult Contemporary Tracks, with twenty-one during the last two decades. Dion also boasts the most AC entries (43) and most number ones among all artists since her arrival. Her last US AC chart entry to date include "Imperfections" from Dion's 2019 album, Courage''.

As lead artist

1980s

1990s

2000s

2010s

As featured artist

Other charted songs

See also
Celine Dion albums discography
Celine Dion videography
List of best-selling music artists

Notes

References 

Singles
Discographies of Canadian artists
Pop music discographies

de:Céline Dion/Diskografie